Hnaberd is a village in the Artashat Municipality of the Ararat Province of Armenia.

References 

Populated places in Ararat Province